Erzinsky District (Erzin kojuun) is an administrative and municipal district (raion, or kozhuun), one of the seventeen in the Tuva Republic, Russia. It is located in the south and southeast of the republic. Its administrative center is the rural locality (a selo) of Erzin. As of the 2010 Census, the total population of the district was 8,280, with the population of Erzin accounting for 38.5% of that number.

History
The district was first established on July 28, 1941. On January 7, 1963, it was abolished and merged into Tes-Khemsky District. Erzinsky District was re-established on January 12, 1965.

References

Notes

Sources

Districts of Tuva
States and territories established in 1941
States and territories disestablished in 1963
States and territories established in 1965
